Platygramme subarechavaletae is a species of script lichen in the family Graphidaceae. Found in Thailand, it was formally described as a new species in 2014 by lichenologists Vasun Poengsungnoen and Klaus Kalb. The lichen has a grey to yellowish-green thallus with a smooth and dull surface. The species epithet alludes to its resemblance to Platygramme arechavaletae.

References

Graphidaceae
Lichen species
Lichens described in 2014
Lichens of Indo-China
Taxa named by Klaus Kalb